Lesbian, gay, bisexual, and transgender (LGBT) persons in the U.S. state of Massachusetts enjoy the same rights as non-LGBT people. The U.S. state of Massachusetts is one of the most LGBT-friendly states in the country. In 2004, it became the first U.S. state to grant marriage licenses to same-sex couples after the decision in Goodridge v. Department of Public Health, and the sixth jurisdiction worldwide, after the Netherlands, Belgium, Ontario, British Columbia, and Quebec.

Massachusetts is regarded as one of the most advanced U.S. states in regards to LGBT rights legislation. Same-sex sexual activity has been legal since 1974. State law bans discrimination on the basis of sexual orientation and gender identity in employment, housing, public accommodations, credit and union practices. In November 2018, it became the first state in the country to support transgender protections through popular vote. In addition, same-sex couples are allowed to adopt, and transgender people may change their legal gender without undergoing sex reassignment surgery. In April 2019, Massachusetts became the 16th US state to ban conversion therapy on LGBT minors.

Massachusetts is home to a vibrant and visible LGBT culture. Boston, the state capital, has been ranked one of the most LGBT-friendly cities in the United States, noted for its LGBT dating scene, events, nightlife, clubs and bars. Several towns located at the tip of Cape Cod are also famous internationally for their high LGBT acceptance and visibility, particularly Provincetown. Northampton, on the other hand, is the town with the most lesbian couples per capita in the entire United States.

History and legality of same-sex sexual activity

1636-1692
In October 1636, Reverend John Cotton submitted a legal code for Massachusetts Bay, which included the death penalty as a crime for sodomy, adultery, incest, and other offenses. The code was not adopted. In November 1636, Plymouth listed sodomy as an offense "punishable by death" and quoted verbatim from Leviticus 20:13. In August 1637, John Allexander and Thomas Roberts were found guilty by a Plymouth court of sodomy. Roberts was later charged, in 1637 of "disorderly living". The law only applied to men. In 1641, Nathaniel Ward's code was enacted instead. The code also prohibited sodomy, with discussions between colony leaders about the definition of "sodomy" and "sodomitical acts". In 1642, a Plymouth court charged Edward Michell and Edward Preston with "lewd & sodomitical practices" but were whipped rather than executed, as was Elizabeth Johnson for a same crime, along with a fine. 

In 1648, Sarah White Norman and Mary Vincent Hammon, of Massachusetts, were prosecuted for "lewd behavior with each other upon a bed"; their trial documents are the only known record of sex between female English colonists in North America in the 17th century. Mary was admonished, while Sarah was convicted. This may be the only conviction for lesbianism in American history. The two women were prosecuted for "lewd behavior with each other upon a bed" in 1648. Hammon was only admonished, possibly because she was only 15 years old at the time of the charges. Sarah, who was probably 10 years older, stood trial. She was convicted in 1650 and required to acknowledge publicly her "unchaste behavior" with Mary, as well as warned against future offenses. 

A terminological update of a 1672 Massachusetts law, in 1697, changed sodomy to a crime called "buggery", which also included bestiality, defining it as "detestable and abominable" and "contrary to the very Light of Nature", and remained a capital crime. Years prior, Reverend Samuel Danforth of Duxbury anonymously published a sermon on "sins of Sodom" after the execution of Benjamin Goad for bestiality led to "criticism in Massachusetts of the late 1600s". The law remained in effect until 1785. In 1692, Mary Henly, who was living in Middlesex County, was arrested for cross-dressing in men’s clothing, with her behavior said to be "confound[ing] the course of nature."  

Scholars disagreed on the reasons and effectiveness for these laws. Scholar Robert F. Oaks argued that changes to sodomy laws, which implemented "strict legal procedures", reduced the number of convictions and arrests for "homosexual activity". He also stated that decline in religious fervor, inability of earlier efforts to stop "illicit sex", and secularization of the state, resulted in fewer prosecutions for "variant sexual activity". Colin L. Talley, a public health scholar, concluded that in British North America, including Massachusetts, statutes against sodomy were "largely unenforced", with ambivalence toward "same-sex eroticism", and stated that such behavior was common while historian Edmond S. Morgan stated that 17th century New England records give the impression of "fairly common" illicit sexual intercourse. He added that offenders were not treated as severely as codes of law would "lead one to believe". Historian Roger Thompson noted three convictions for sodomy in Plymouth between 1636 and 1649, and said that cases in Massachusetts during the 17th Century were  "rare". He disagreed with Morgan and Oaks, arguing that homosexual behavior was infrequent and "hardly ever occurred". Scholar John M. Murrin stated that treatment of men or boys "accused of sodomy" in New England mirrored practices in other parts of British North America. He also argued that bestiality was an "abomination and obsession" of those in 17th century New England.

1712-1915
In January 1712, a Black man named Mingo, a man enslaved to Wait Winthrop, was executed for the crime of "buggery". In 1755, a Massachusetts soldier named Bickerstaff, at Lake George, received a sentence of 100 lashes for swearing and a "sodomitical attempt", and was publicly humiliated, but not executed. In 1771, the Suffolk Inferior Court and, later, Superior Court, decided the case of Gray v. Pitts. The case was regraded by contemporary historians as an example of the "gay panic" defense and an early case regarding cross-dressing in Colonial America. The case has been documented and included in the Legal Papers of John Adams, since John Adams was appointed as the attorney for Pitts and Josiah Quincy Jr. as the attorney for Gray. The case has also been archived and researched as part of an OutHistory online exhibit. The Massachusetts Constitution on 1780 included a provision making sodomy a crime, based on the Buggery Act 1533 in the United Kingdom.

In 1805, death penalty for sodomy was removed, with the punishment changing to one year of solitary confinement and ten years of hard labor. Massachusetts law was revised again in 1835 to eliminate solitary confinement as a punishment, but increasing the sentence for sodomy to twenty years of hard labor. In 1866, a church committee of men was formed to investigate reports that Horatio Alger had sexually molested boys. Alger did not deny the charges and he Brewster, Massachusetts, and left for New York City. In June 1868, Samuel M. Andrews was indicted by the Massachusetts Supreme Judicial Court for the murder of Cornelius Holmes, his "dear friend and long–term companion", with the sexual nature of the crime generating public attention. Scholar Leslie Margolin pieced together the relationship between the two men, noting the intimacy of their relations, their cohabitation, that Holmes' attorneys barred any evidence of sodomy between the two during the trial, and noted that Andrews had a "spirit-crushing religious fear" which led to panic, then murder of Holmes. 

In the case of Commonwealth v. Snow, in January 1873, the Massachusetts Supreme Judicial Court ruled against James A. Snow, who was indicted on charges of sodomy against young boys. In 1879, a Massachusetts law was passed which prohibited sale any "instrument or other article intended to be used for self abuse" which was intended at masturbation but also included sex toys. The Massachusetts legislature enacted a law in 1887 which prohibited "unnatural and lascivious acts" and aimed at oral sex, with the first case under this law decided in 1894. In the case, Commonwealth v. Dill, the Massachusetts Supreme Judicial Court stated that the indictment that a defendant committed "a certain unnatural and lascivious act" was sufficient enough. In another case under the 1887 law, Commonwealth v. Delano, in 1908, the Massachusetts Supreme Judicial Court stated that "any and all unnatural and lascivious acts" were outlawed. In 1915, the Massachusetts legislature passed a law which prohibited using any saloon, cafe, or restaurant "for the purpose of immoral solicitation or immoral bargaining". In 1918, the legislature revised the 1887 law, lowering the penalty of those convicted from 3 years to 2 1/2 years.

1920-1992
During two weeks in May and June 1920, an ad hoc disciplinary tribunal headed  of five administrators at Harvard University, and headed by acting dean Chester Noyes Greenough. They conducted more than 30 interviews behind closed doors and took action against eight students, a recent graduate, and an assistant professor for charges of homosexual activity.
 They were expelled or had their association with the university severed. Two of the students were later readmitted. It was not revealed until 2002. U.S. history scholar George Chauncey said that the gay life at Harvard was "typical" as was the reaction of the university. This ad hoc tribunal was later written about by William Wright in his 304-page book, Harvard's Secret Court: The Savage 1920 Purge of Campus Homosexuals. 

In January 1921, in the case of Commonwealth v. Porter, the Massachusetts Supreme Judicial Court upheld a conviction of an individual for "maintaining a nuisance" where "indecent and unnatural acts" took place. The court also concluded that they saw "no error of law in the ruling" or in conduct of the trial which resulted in the conviction. The state enacted a law in 1923 which permitted a trial judge to bar the public from trials in which those under age 17 are victims of any crime "involving sex".The age was changed to 18 in 1931. Massachusetts statues, from 1939 to 1945, required notice to police "data about any person convicted of sodomy" about to be released from a prison, and filing of mental health report on those "arrested for sodomy" before bail. In 1952, selectman of Provincetown, Massachusetts enacted laws that banned drag shows and forbade restaurants and bars from becoming "habitual gathering place for home-sexuals of either sex", but the laws were ineffective at preventing this. In 1954 and 1959, Massachusetts Supreme Judicial Court ruled in favor of the existing sodomy laws. In the case of 
Jaquith v. Commonwealth in 1954, the court stated that the existing sodomy statute was constitutional and the court permitted sodomy convictions "based largely on circumstantial evidence" in the 1959 case of Commonwealth v. Marshall 

In 1972, a proposed criminal code for Massachusetts was published, which would have repealed "crime against nature" and "unnatural and lascivious acts" laws, but the code was never enacted. In Commonwealth v. Balthazar, the same year, the Massachusetts Supreme Judicial Court ruled that the statute which prohibited "any unnatural and lascivious act with another person" was inapplicable to "private, consensual conduct of adults". In the cases of Commonwealth v. Scagliotti (1977) and Commonwealth v. Ferguson (1981), the Massachusetts Supreme Judicial Court overturned convictions for "an unnatural and lascivious act". The court, in 1980, in Commonwealth v. Sefranka, ruled against police actions which attempted to entrap gay men. In the 1984 case of Commonwealth v. Bloom, the Massachusetts Court of Appeals upheld the conviction of Frederick Bloom for "engaging in consensual sexual relations" in a public area. The court argued there wasn't a "reasonable expectation" of privacy for Bloom. In 1992, the police raided a private home in Boston where a police officer saw 160 men "engaging in an evening of mutual masturbation", resulting a police raid in which people were arrested on charges of obscenity and "operating a house of ill fame." In the case of Doe v. Attorney General (1997) the Massachusetts Supreme Judicial Court ruled that a man convicted of engaging in "unnatural acts" on an undercover officer could not suffer legal consequences without due process. The case was remanded to the court in 1999, which concluded that a "individualized hearing is required".

1992-Present
In 2001, Gay & Lesbian Advocates & Defenders (GLAD),  group of lawyers which "represent gay and lesbian interests in court", sued the Massachusetts Attorney General and two District Attorneys challenging both statutes. Massachusetts Supreme Judicial Court dismissed the case on February 21, 2002, because the plaintiffs did not present an instance of prosecution and therefore failed to meet the Court's "actual controversy requirement." The Court noted that the defendants' stipulation "that their offices will not prosecute anyone under the challenged laws absent probable cause to believe that the prohibited conduct occurred either in public or without consent" satisfied the Court's holding in Commonwealth v. Balthazar with respect to §35. It also extended its holding that "consensual conduct in private between adults is not prohibited" to apply to §34. 

Massachusetts has not repealed its sodomy law and it remains on the books. The Massachusetts General Court has voted down bills in committee for years, to repeal and abolish sodomy laws within sections of both §34 and §35. During the 2018 session of the Massachusetts General Court, outdated laws on abortion, adultery and fornication were repealed, but not the laws on sodomy, anal sex, and oral sex still listed within sections 34 and 35. Presently, Massachusetts does not restrict private sexual behavior between consenting adults. It has two statutes that implicate homosexual activity: §34 prohibits the "abominable and detestable crime against nature" and §35 prohibits "any unnatural and lascivious act with another person."

Recognition of same-sex relationships

Marriage

Massachusetts authorized same-sex marriages within the state following the Supreme Judicial Court (SJC) ruling on November 18, 2003 in Goodridge v. Department of Public Health that it was unconstitutional under the state Constitution for state agencies to restrict marriage to heterosexual couples. The Court gave the state Legislature 180 days to enact laws pursuant to the judgment. In the absence of legislative action, Governor Mitt Romney ordered town clerks to begin issuing marriage certificates to same-sex couples beginning May 17, 2004. Attempts to enact an amendment to the state Constitution to prohibit same-sex marriage, the last in 2007, have been unsuccessful.

A 1913 state law that forbade non-residents from marrying in Massachusetts if their marriage would be void in their home state was repealed on July 31, 2008.

On July 26, 2012, the SJC ruled in Elia-Warnken v. Elia that the state recognizes a civil union established in a different jurisdiction as the equivalent of marriage. It termed a Massachusetts marriage entered into by a man who was already a party to a Vermont civil union with a third party "polygamy" and therefore void. On September 28, 2012, the SJC ruled in that "Because the parties to California [registered domestic partnerships] have rights and responsibilities identical to those of marriage", it is proper to treat such relationships "as equivalent to marriage" in Massachusetts.

Adoption and parenting
In May 1985, in response to a public controversy about same-sex couple Don Babets and David Jean, who were acting as foster parents, Massachusetts issued regulations designed to prevent such couples from serving as foster parents. The state rescinded those regulations in April 1990 as part of an out-of-court settlement of a suit brought by Gay & Lesbian Advocates & Defenders (GLAD) and the American Civil Liberties Union (ACLU), following a five-year campaign by an ad hoc group formed around the issue, Foster Equality. The state has allowed second-parent adoption by a parent of the same sex as the existing parent since a court decision, In re Adoption of Tammy, in 1993. In July 1999, the same court awarded visitation rights to each of two mothers after their separation.

In 2004, following the legalization of same-sex marriage in Massachusetts, Governor Mitt Romney prevented the state's Registry of Vital Records from revising its birth certificate forms to allow for options other than one mother and one father, instead requiring hand-written changes to the documents only after receiving approval from the Governor's legal counsel. The forms were changed when Governor Deval Patrick took office in 2007.

In March 2006, Catholic Charities of Boston announced it would no longer provide adoption services because it could not comply with Massachusetts law prohibiting discrimination against homosexuals.

In February 2011, Massachusetts Health Commissioner John Auerbach announced plans by the end of March to standardize birth certificates, formerly designed by each city or town, by providing hospitals with electronic forms with fields labeled "mother/parent" and "father/parent". He called the system "more sensitive to the circumstances of the family and to the children."

Discrimination protections
Since 1989, Massachusetts has prohibited discrimination based on sexual orientation in credit, public and private employment, union practices, housing, and public accommodation. It was the second state to add sexual orientation to its anti-discrimination statute, following Wisconsin in 1982.

On February 17, 2011, Governor Deval Patrick issued an executive order banning discrimination on the part of the state or its contractors against transgender employees of the state Government. He reiterated his support for legislation to extend similar protection to all transgender persons in the state. Massachusetts enacted such legislation prohibiting discrimination based on gender identity in credit, public and private employment, union practices and housing—but not public accommodations—on November 23, 2011, effective on July 1, 2012. By the end of 2015, a bill was pending to prohibit discrimination based on gender identity in public accommodations, but its future was still uncertain. Finally, on May 12, 2016, the state Senate voted 33–4 to approve the bill. The Massachusetts House of Representatives on July 7, 2016 passed a bill by a vote of 117–36 to include gender identity to the public accommodations law. The bill was signed into law the next day, by Massachusetts Republican Governor Charlie Baker, and scheduled to take effect on October 1, 2016. In October 2016, however, anti-transgender activists submitted the minimum number of signatures necessary, to the Secretary of the Commonwealth, to put the law up for repeal on a statewide ballot measure. Voters decided on November 6, 2018 to retain the law, with 67.8% in favor of upholding law, and 32.2% opposed. The Massachusetts Gender Identity Anti-Discrimination Initiative was the first-ever statewide ballot question of its kind in the United States.

In June 2012, on instructions from Worcester's Roman Catholic Bishop Robert McManus, diocesan officials declined to sell a property owned by the diocese to a same-sex couple and in July lied about what happened when questioned about the sale. In September, the couple filed suit against the bishop and other parties to the negotiations.

On January 29, 2014, Matthew Barrett represented by GLAD filed a complaint with the Massachusetts Commission Against Discrimination against Fontbonne Academy, a Catholic secondary school, because in July 2013 the school had withdrawn an offer of employment as food service manager when officials learned he was in a same-sex marriage. The case moved to Massachusetts Superior Court, and on December 16, 2015, Judge Douglas H. Wilkins ruled in Barrett v. Fontbonne Academy that the Academy had violated the state's laws against discrimination on the basis of sexual orientation and gender.

Anti-bullying legislation was enacted in May 2010. It "requires schools to adopt clear procedures for reporting and investigating cases of bullying, as well as methods for preventing retaliation against those who report problems."

Since August 2021, the Massachusetts Supreme Judicial Court made a ruling that sexual orientation is a protective class - for picking a system of LGB juries within Massachusetts.

Hate crime law

Massachusetts added sexual orientation to the categories protected by its 1983 hate crime legislation in June 1996. The state defines a hate crime as "any criminal act coupled with overt actions motivated by bigotry and bias, including, but not limited to, a threatened, attempted or completed overt act motivated at least in part by racial, religious, ethnic, handicap, gender or sexual orientation prejudice, or which otherwise deprives another person of his constitutional rights by threats, intimidation or coercion, or which seek to interfere with or disrupt a person's exercise of constitutional rights through harassment or intimidation."

Massachusetts adopted the Hate Crimes Reporting Act in 1990. The legislation created a Crime Reporting Unit to collect hate crime incident reports from law enforcement and required the unit to summarize and report on the information. Regulations establish criteria for determining whether a crime is a hate crime, provide a means for advocacy organizations to report hate incidents, specify the content of crime and incident reports, and specify the content of the annual report. The crime report unit of the State Police must also collect, summarize and report hate crime data to the state Attorney General and to several legislative committees. The reports are available on public record.

In 1991, the Governor created the Task Force on Hate Crimes. The task force's principal tasks are (1) developing regulations to implement the Hate Crimes Reporting Act, (2) coordinating training efforts, (3) increasing submission of hate crime data, and (4) working with community organizations and victims' groups. Initiatives for 2000 include pilot programs in high schools, youth diversion programs, a new correctional diversity awareness program, outreach coordination, a victimization survey in schools, public awareness, creating civil rights investigative teams, encouragement of reporting by law enforcement, and continued training.

The term "gender identity" was added to the state's hate crime statute, effective July 1, 2012.

Gender identity and expression
Massachusetts allows transgender individuals to amend their birth certificate to reflect their gender identity. Sex reassignment surgery is not a requirement.

Non-binary driver licences

In November 2019, it was announced that both Massachusetts I.D.s and driver licences had upgraded software by the Massachusetts RMV - to include the non-binary option of "gender X" (alongside male and female on forms and applications) effective immediately. For years bills on gender X drivers licences never passed the Massachusetts General Court - to implement these policies, so it was done by internal regulation and policy instead.

Non-binary birth certificates
In September 2021, the Massachusetts Senate passed a bill to allow gender X (alongside male and female) on an individual's birth certificate. The Massachusetts House of Representatives is yet to vote on the bill.

Reaffirmed gender healthcare law
In July 2022, an extensive bill passed both houses of the Massachusetts General Court - that codifies "reaffirmed gender healthcare protections" embedded within Massachusetts legislation. The Governor of Massachusetts signed the bill into law. The law went into effect immediately, due to an "emergency clause" within the bill - bypassing the usual 90-day period Massachusetts laws go into effect after enactment from the Governor.

Intersex rights 
In October 2020, Boston Children's Hospital announced they would stop performing clitoroplasties and vaginoplasties in intersex infants without meaningful conversation and consent from the child. This broke from decades old medical protocol which included medical and surgical intervention to alter the physical appearance of the infant's genitals but carried risks of loss of sensation, fertility issues, pain during intercourse and incontinence.

Conversion therapy

In June 2018, the Massachusetts House of Representatives passed a bill by a vote of 137–14 to legally ban conversion therapy practices on minors. The bill, however, failed to pass the Massachusetts Senate before it adjourned sine die.

On March 13, 2019, the Massachusetts House of Representatives passed H140, which would ban conversion therapy on minors, by a vote of 147–8. The bill was approved by the state Senate with amendments by a vote of 34–0 on March 28, 2019. An engrossed bill was enacted on April 4, 2019, and awaited consideration by Massachusetts Governor Charlie Baker, who indicated he was "inclined to support" such legislation. The Governor signed the bill into law on April 8, 2019 and it went into effect immediately.

Public opinion and attitudes

According to a 2017 Public Religion Research Institute (PRRI), 80% of Massachusetts residents supported same-sex marriage, whereas 13% were opposed and 7% were undecided. This was the highest support recorded in the United States, tied with Vermont. The PRRI poll also showed that support for anti-discrimination laws covering sexual orientation and gender identity enjoyed wide popular support. Likewise, 80% were in favor of such laws, while 13% were opposed. 70% also expressed opposition to religious-based refusals to serve LGBT people. 23% expressed support.

A 2020 PRRI Institute poll found 77% of Massachusetts residents supported same-sex marriage and 19% opposed.

Summary table

See also

Hurley v. Irish-American Gay, Lesbian, and Bisexual Group of Boston
Politics of Massachusetts
Law of Massachusetts
LGBT culture in Boston

References